is a Japanese manga series written and illustrated by Takashi Sano. It was serialized in the Shōnen Gahōsha magazine Young King Comics from 1997 to 2010.

An anime television series adaptation by J.C.Staff aired on TBS in February 1999. A live-action theatrical film version was released in October 2009.

Plot
Sixteen-year-old Keisuke Saji loves to fantasize about young beautiful women. He hopes to land the object of his affection, Akira Koizumi. Koizumi is a classic tsundere, switching between violence towards Saji and affection. While most guys take Koizumi's cold shoulder as a hint, Saji pursues head-on without having rejection faze him.

Characters

Saji is a 16-year-old high school student with spiky hair who loves everything about women.

Koizumi is a young girl with blue hair and red eyes. Her looks and figure has the guys in school turning their heads, including Saji. However, Koizumi expresses her rejections from the proposals of the boys by physically assaulting them. Out of all the guys she meets, Saji is her favorite target to take her frustrations out on.

Yuki is Saji's busty childhood friend and somewhat an unintentional rival to Koizumi. Yuki has grown well-proportioned and shapely. However, her charm and body, while still able to make guys drool, are not as effective as Koizumi grace and mystery. Despite her appearance, she has very low self-esteem.

One of Koizumi's friends, Ryoko has long purple hair. She tends to remain calm despite whatever is going on around her.

Another of Koizumi's friends, Maki has brown hair either short or in pigtails. She tends to be a bit more high-strung than Ryoko.

Koizumi's lesbian friend who behaves as if they were former lovers. She is part of a small circle of friends who sell themselves to men with usually perverse intentions, Koizumi having become a part of the group for a while in her search for acceptance.

Apparently an old friend of Saji and Yuki. Both he and Saji joined the basketball team at the same time to pick up girls.

Sakurai is a young boy who is gay. He is the same height as Koizumi.
 

One of Saji's classmates who wears glasses. He encourages Saji to go forward with his declaration of love for Koizumi, despite everything backfiring on him.

One of Saji's classmates who has brown hair. Like Urawa, he encourage Saji to go forward with his declaration of love for Koizumi.

Media

Manga
Iketeru Futari, written and illustrated by Takashi Sano, was serialized in Shōnen Gahōsha's Young King magazine from 1997 to April 26, 2010. It has been collected in thirty-three tankōbon volumes.

A spinoff manga series titled  was serialized in Young King separate volume Kingdom from 1998 to 2004 and then in Young King Comics from 2005 to 2006. It has been collected in nine tankōbon volumes.

Volume list

Iketeru Futari

Iketeru Keiji

Anime
An anime television series adaptation aired on TBS from February 2 to February 26, 1999. The series was produced by J.C.Staff and directed by Takeshi Yamaguchi, with Ryoichi Oki designing the characters, and Moka composing the music. Yuki Kimura performed the theme "Fall in YOU".

Live-action film
A live-action film adaptation was produced by GP Museum Soft and directed by Wataru Oku. It received a theatrical release in Tokyo's Cinemart Roppongi from October 2 to October 4, 2009.

References

External links

1997 manga
1999 anime television series debuts
1999 Japanese television series endings
2009 films
2009 romantic comedy films
Anime series based on manga
J.C.Staff
Manga adapted into films
Romantic comedy anime and manga
School life in anime and manga
Seinen manga
Sex comedy anime and manga
Shōnen Gahōsha manga
TBS Television (Japan) original programming
Wonderful (TV programming block)
Japanese romantic comedy films
Japanese sex comedy films